Spanish irredentism mainly focuses on claims over the British overseas territory of Gibraltar, whose long-standing territorial vindication as a British colony is enshrined in the Spanish foreign policy. Along history, other minor irredentist proposals have claimed territories such as the whole of Portugal, Andorra, parts of Northern Africa, the Roussillon (including Cerdanya) and the French Basque Country (including Lower Navarre).

Unification of Iberia 

A Spain holding all of the Iberian Peninsula became a topic in Spanish nationalism beginning in the 19th century, with proponents idealizing historical Roman Hispania when all of the Iberian Peninsula was united under the same rule. The identification of a unified Hispanian cultural heritage both encompassing Portugal and Spain had been developed centuries earlier with the publishing of Juan de Mariana's History of Spain (1598), in which Mariana supported a Hispanian identity based on the Reconquista, on both countries' Roman-Visigothic heritage and their common Catholic and monarchical polities.

There has been strong Spanish objection to the separation of Gibraltar from Spain since British acquisition in the Treaty of Utrecht (1713) in the aftermath of the Spanish War of Succession. During the Spanish Civil War, the Carlists and the Falange prior to the two parties' unification in 1937 both promoted the incorporation of Portugal into Spain. The Carlists stated that a Carlist Spain would retake Gibraltar and conquer Portugal. The Falange, both prior to and after its merger with the Carlists, supported the unification of Gibraltar and Portugal into Spain, during its early years of existence the Falange produced maps of Spain that included Portugal as a province of Spain. After the Spanish Civil War and the victory of the Nationalist faction led by Francisco Franco, radical members of the Falange called for the incorporation of Portugal and the French Pyrenees into Spain. Franco in a communiqué with Germany on 26 May 1942 declared that Portugal should be annexed into Spain.

The years of World War II were fertile in the projection by several authors of irredentist imaginaries across the Strait of Gibraltar (after all the Strait was to become the "neuralgic point of nationality" to them): according to the Africanist Tomás García Figueras "Spain and Morocco are like two halves of the same geographical unity". Historian Jaume Vicens Vives (1940) talked about a "vital space" conceptualised as a "geopolitical basic unit". Rodolfo Gil Benumeya traced the links back to the Neolithic, pointing to a common Ibero-Berber People living at both sides of the Strait. Gil Benumeya and Hernández Pacheco stressed the strengthening of those links due to Morocco being part of "Hispania Tingitana". Some of these authors, transcending historical arguments, even pointed at a Spanish-African union during "the Tertiary" when the Strait would not have existed.

To a lesser extent the territories adjacent to Equatorial Guinea were also subject to irredentist rhetoric in this time, and as well were claims about the Spanishness of Andorra, the Roussillon, the Cerdanya, the Lower Navarre and the French Basque Country and the yearning for an approximation with Portugal.

See also
 Gibraltar
 United Nations list of colonial territories
 Spanish nationalism
 Iberian federalism

References

 
Irredentism